"Conqueror" is the eighth single released by Aurora and the fifth single from All My Demons Greeting Me as a Friend. It was written by Aurora, Geir Luedy, Odd Martin Skålnes and Magnus Skylstad and produced by Skålnes, Skylstad and Jeremy Wheatley. On January 15, 2016 the song was officially released worldwide.

Background and composition 
"Conqueror" is a Scandipop, synth-pop, and electropop song with "clattering drum beats building towards a euphoric chorus". Aurora wrote this song in 2013 with some of her band members.

She said: "This song is a rather strange one. It's an important contrast to all the other songs on my album - it's actually a bit happy! I wrote it with some of my band members during 2013 once. It was just for fun, we didn't even know if anything good would come out it!"

"'Conqueror' is about a world [that] is kind of falling apart around you, and you're looking for a conqueror to save you. But you're looking for the conqueror in someone else, which I think is [something] you should not do. You should find the conqueror in yourself first, and be your own hero. If you stand strong, then you will stand for a bit longer."

Music video 
A music video for the song was released on February 16, 2016. It was directed by Kenny McCracken.

Charts

References

2016 singles
2016 songs
Aurora (singer) songs
Songs written by Aurora (singer)
Synth-pop songs
Songs written by Magnus Skylstad